is a kart racing game developed by Arika and published by Square Enix. The game is a spin-off of the Final Fantasy series and is a sequel to 1999's Chocobo Racing. It was released for the Nintendo Switch on March 10, 2022 in celebration of the series' 35th anniversary, and features locales and characters from across the franchise.

Chocobo GP received mixed reviews from critics; while praise was given for its controls, track designs, items and character-specific abilities, heavy criticism was given for the game's monetisation model, with some likening it to that of a free mobile game.

Gameplay
The game is a kart racing game featuring single-player and multiplayer modes. The player chooses a character from the Final Fantasy series of video games and directs them through a race track in efforts to finish before the other racers. Players can perform power-slide drifts to help make tight turns and get extra speed boosts. Items called "magicite" can be collected by driving a character into "Magic Eggs", and can be used to either help the player's character, or hinder other racers. Individual characters also have specific abilities, and vehicles can be customized by the player. The game features multiple modes, including a "story mode", custom races, and online races. The online races include a 64 player elimination tournament mode as well.

Setting
The game's story mode includes characters entering a racing tournament offers a winning prize of "a wish for anything their heart desires". Race courses are set in locations from various Final Fantasy games, such as the Gold Saucer from Final Fantasy VII, the town of Zozo from Final Fantasy VI and the town of Alexandria from Final Fantasy IX. Characters in the game include both specific party members from previous Final Fantasy games and characters from the previous Chocobo spin-off games. The roster includes Chocobos, Moogles, White Mages, Black Mages, Vivi, Steiner, Cactuar, and Maduin, among others. Cloud Strife and Squall Leonhart were added to the roster in Season 1 as a prize pass unlockable and purchasable character with Gil, respectively.

Development
The game is a sequel to the 1999 PlayStation game Chocobo Racing. A follow-up to the game was first announced in 2010 for the Nintendo 3DS, though its development was outsourced, the quality suffered, and it was quietly cancelled by 2013. In March 2021, publications noted trademarks being filed for a Chocobo GP and Chocobo Grand Prix. On September 23, 2021, Chocobo GP was officially announced during a Nintendo Direct broadcast. It released for the Nintendo Switch on March 10, 2022, alongside a free version of the game, titled Chocobo GP Lite. This free-to-play version of the game included the Story Prologue, Chocobo GP mode, three characters, local and online multiplayer, and allowed players to transfer their progress over to the full version of the game after purchase. The full version features a battle pass and microtransactions. The game's soundtrack was composed by Hidenori Iwasaki.

Reception 

Chocobo GP received "mixed or average" reviews according to review aggregator Metacritic.

Destructoid gave the game a 6.5 out of 10, writing, "...if you’re looking for a serviceable racer to play on the side that’s full of old school unlocks [Chocobo GP]'s a fine option; provided you can get past a few hurdles. Hopefully a series of patches, the eventual possible elimination of the season pass system, and a price cut will make this package way more enticing." Nintendo Life and Shacknews reviewed the game more positively, praising the controls, tracks, character-specific abilities, items, roster, modes, performance, and the potential of the Chocobo GP mode, while criticizing the weak story mode and paid season pass.

Chocobo GP monetization model was panned by players, with some likening it to a mobile game. Players expressed concerns about the length of time it would take to gain levels in-game. In response, Square Enix announced they would give players set amounts of free in-game currency, known as mythril, and promised that it had adjusted settings to make progression easier. It was discovered by players that free mythril would expire five months after it was accrued, while any mythril paid for would remain.

Chocobo GP was the sixth bestselling retail game during its first week of release in Japan, with 12,414 physical copies being sold.

Notes

References

External links
 

2022 video games
Arika games
Chocobo games
Kart racing video games
Nintendo Switch games
Nintendo Switch-only games
Square Enix games
Video games developed in Japan
Video games scored by Hidenori Iwasaki